The WTA Tier IV tournaments were Women's Tennis Association fourth-level tournaments held from 1990 until the end of the 2008 season. The line-up of events varied over the years, with tournaments being promoted, demoted or cancelled. Some of the tournaments became Tier V events between 1990 and 1992, and later from 2001 to 2005, before being integrated back into Tier IV.

From 2009 WTA Tour, WTA changed the tournament categories, so that most of the Tier III and Tier IV tournaments from 2008 were in one category, WTA International tournaments.

Events

References

External links

 Tier 4
Recurring sporting events disestablished in 2008
Recurring sporting events established in 1990